Taylor Township is one of eighteen townships in Appanoose County, Iowa, United States. As of the 2010 census, its population was 870.

Geography
According to the USGS, it contains five cemeteries: Denny, Fairview now called Main Station, Hillcrest, Moravia and New Hope.

References

Source: Appanoose County Cemeteries, compiled by the Appanoose County Genealogy - Historical Society, 1986, revised 2007

External links
 US-Counties.com
 City-Data.com

Townships in Appanoose County, Iowa
Townships in Iowa